Kivinen is a Finnish surname. Notable people with the surname include:

 Lauri Kivinen
 Markku Kivinen (born 1951), Finnish sociologist
 S. Albert Kivinen (born 1933), Finnish philosopher
 Taru Kivinen, Finnish curler
 Timo Kivinen

Finnish-language surnames